Forge Valley is a national nature reserve in the Scarborough 
district of North Yorkshire, England, located within the North York Moors National Park on the East Ayton / Hackness road. The valley follows the route of the River Derwent and was formed by melting ice water at the end of the last ice age.

The area is now covered with woodlands which are thought to be 6,000 years old.  Forge Valley takes its name from the fact that charcoal that was made in these woods for iron forges. There was a foundry to the north of the valley in 1798.

Forge Valley is managed by Raincliffe Woods Community Enterprise CIC.

See also
 Forge Valley railway station

References

External links

 Forge Valley Geological trail
 A journey with fortification - a walk through Forge Valley's wood

Sites of Special Scientific Interest in North Yorkshire
Valleys of the North York Moors